Ikechukwu Justin (Yitzhak) "Ike" Ofoegbu (born November 9, 1984) is an American-Nigerian professional basketball player for Maccabi Ashdod of the Israeli Premier League. He is a 2.05 m (6 ft 8.75) tall power forward-center. He played college basketball with SMU.

Professional career
On March 8, 2013, Ofoegbu signed with Bucaneros de La Guaira of Venezuela for the 2013 BSN season.

On July 27, 2013, Ofoegbu signed with Israeli club Maccabi Haifa for the 2013–14 season. On July 19, 2014, he re-signed with Maccabi for one more season. On June 11, 2015, he signed with Capitanes de Arecibo of Puerto Rico for the rest of the 2015 BSN season.

On October 20, 2015, Ofoegbu signed with Israeli club Maccabi Tel Aviv to replace injured Brian Randle. On December 24, 2015, he re-signed with Maccabi till the end of February, and later re-signed for the rest of the season.

On August 29, 2016, Ofoegbu signed with Turkish club Best Balıkesir for the 2016–17 season.

On October 13, 2017, Ofoegbu signed with Uşak Sportif.

On April 29, Ofoegbu returned to Capitanes de Arecibo.

On December 19, 2019, Ofoegbu returned to Israel for a third stint, signing with Maccabi Ashdod for the rest of the season.

National team
In 2011 and 2012, Ofoegbu was a member of the senior Nigerian national basketball team.

References

External links
 Euroleague.net profile
 FIBA.com profile

1984 births
Living people
Aguacateros de Michoacán players
American expatriate basketball people in Belgium
American expatriate basketball people in Israel
American expatriate basketball people in Mexico
American expatriate basketball people in Turkey
American expatriate basketball people in Venezuela
American men's basketball players
American sportspeople of Nigerian descent
Basketball players from San Antonio
Best Balıkesir B.K. players
Bucaneros de La Guaira players
Caciques de Humacao players
Capitanes de Arecibo players
Centers (basketball)
Gent Hawks players
Maccabi Ashdod B.C. players
Maccabi Haifa B.C. players
Maccabi Tel Aviv B.C. players
Nigerian expatriate basketball people in Israel
Nigerian expatriate basketball people in Mexico
Nigerian expatriate basketball people in Turkey
Nigerian men's basketball players
Power forwards (basketball)
SMU Mustangs men's basketball players
Toros de Nuevo Laredo players
Uşak Sportif players